Srpuhi Mayrabed Nshan Kalfayan (Armenian: Սրբուհի Մայրապետ Նշան Գալֆաեան) (Born February 17, 1822 in Kartal, Istanbul; † July 4, 1889 in Hasköy, Istanbul) was an Armenian nun and founder of the Order of Kalfayan, plus a school and an orphanage for girls in Constantinople.

Biography
Kalfayan vowed to become a nun at the age of 12 when she lost her father, and she achieved it in 1840.

Kalfayan founded both the Order of Kalfayan and, in 1850, a school for girls which still stands today, though it now accepts boys as well.  In 1865 she mobilized financial support for the victims of a cholera epidemic and on 1 January 1866 she opened an orphanage for girls in Hasköy, Constantinople.

Death and commemoration
Kalyfan died on 4 July 1889.

Her name is commemorated in the Kalfayan Elementary School.

See also
 Confiscated Armenian properties in Turkey

References

External links
Kalfayan Elementary School

People from Istanbul
Armenians from the Ottoman Empire
Armenian Apostolic Christians
Armenian nuns
Armenian philanthropists
1822 births
1889 deaths
Oriental Orthodox nuns
19th-century philanthropists